Kozachok (from Cossacks) is a hamlet in the Grayvoronsky district of Belgorod in Central Russia, Russia. 600 km South of Moscow. It is located near the Vorskla River. In 2010 its population was 22.

References

Belgorod